The McDougall United Church is a church located in Downtown Edmonton, Alberta, Canada, at 10086 MacDonald Drive NW.

History

McDougall United Church was founded as a Methodist church in Edmonton. Methodists started coming to Alberta in 1840, when Robert Rundle came to Fort Edmonton. He was an itinerant missionary, later another missionary by the name of Peter Campbell came to Edmonton in the 1860s. It was still 10 years before Edmonton had a resident Methodist. George McDougall established a school in 1871, to teach English to the children of the Hudson's Bay Company employees, because the most used languages then were French, Gaelic, and Cree.

The McDougalls were a family of Methodist missionaries: George and his son John started missions to the native people in Pakan (north east of Edmonton), and Morley (west of Calgary). After the smallpox epidemic of 1870, in which many of the McDougall women and children died, the survivors moved to Edmonton before moving to Morley. The second Methodist church was built in 1892 and called "McDougall Church" in honour of the now deceased founder. The current brick McDougall Church was built in 1910 and dedicated to the honor of George McDougall.

References 

Churches in Edmonton
Churches completed in 1910
20th-century United Church of Canada church buildings
Christian organizations established in 1910
United Church of Canada churches in Alberta
Italianate architecture in Canada
Italianate church buildings